The National Basketball Association has links to hip hop music and has also had its own famous anthem in "Roundball Rock". In recent years, the league has embraced country music and musicians and bands that could be considered tame by some observers (such as Tom Petty and the Heartbreakers, Rob Thomas and Justin Timberlake).

Before the league introduced its current promotional phrase Big Things Will Happen, the league's former promotional phrases were America's Game/NBA Action: It's Fantastic (1980s–1992), I Love This Game (1992–2007) and Where Amazing Happens (2007–2011).

Hip hop

For several years, the NBA embraced "hip-hop culture". Rappers Nelly and Jay-Z have ownership stakes in NBA teams (the Charlotte Hornets and Brooklyn Nets respectively), and many artists have worn NBA throwback jerseys in music videos. In turn, the NBA plays rap and hip-hop in arenas during games, and ABC/ESPN used the music during game coverage. Some NBA players have tried rap or hip-hop themselves (Shaquille O'Neal, Kobe Bryant, Tony Parker, Allen Iverson (under the rap name "Jewelz"), and notoriously, Metta World Peace are some examples. In 1994, Epic Records released an album entitled B-Ball's Best Kept Secret, which featured hip hop songs performed by several NBA players, including Jason Kidd, Dana Barros and Isaiah Rider.

The connection has often been noted from the large African American constituency of players, which also dominate the hip hop industry. Another source of comparison is the inner city's traditional appeal to basketball, which also helped foster hip hop and its culture in its early beginnings.

Television

CBS

Unlike later NBA broadcast partners, CBS used lyrics in their theme music from 1973–76. They were also used for most of the 1978–79 season. The lyrics, sung in an upbeat fashion by an ensemble of singers, were paired with visuals using rotoscoped basketball players in silhouette, against a black background and outlined in different colors. The lyrics for the full version (there were also shorter versions of the theme and lyrics presented below) are below:

Give it all you've got,
Take your very best shot
And may the best team win.
The time is now, the name of the game is action.

They're on the floor,
And they're ready to score,
So let the game begin,
And let's see how the ball's going to bounce today

Welcome to N-B-A.
Come on, and join the roar of the crowd
Here's another classic about,
To come your way...

You'll see the best in basketball
When you watch the N-B-A,
When you watch the N-B-A on C-B-S.

(N-B-A on C-B-S, N-B-A on C-B-S, ... etc. fading out)

Starting in 1977, CBS used an alternate opening showing a montage of still pictures of current NBA star athletes with music (similar to the music used by the network for its CBS' NFL coverage at that time) accompanying it. During the 1977–78 season CBS used highlights and various shots of the arena where the game would take place to the music of Van McCoy's "Two Points". In 1980, CBS used rotoscoped animation in silhouette of one player shooting a jumpshot and the ball in mid air rolling all the NBA teams as it spun in the air, with the music of Francis Monkman's "G-Force" behind it. During the 1978–79 season, the music for the highlights was "Chase", the theme by Giorgio Moroder for the movie Midnight Express. The opening guitar and horn riff of the Chicago hit "Alive Again" were used for the highlights prior to the opening animation during the 1979–80 and 1980–81 seasons.

By the 1983 NBA Finals, the opening sequence was set in a primitive computer-generated montage of basketball action inside a virtual arena that looked similar to the Boston Garden. This opening sequence (which was usually intertwined by a montage of live basketball action complete with narration) was created by Bill Feigenbaum, who also created a similar open for The NFL Today used around the same time. This opening melody (mostly consisting of an uptempo series of four notes and three bars each) from 1983–1988 is generally considered to be the most familiar theme music that The NBA on CBS used.

For the 1989 NBA Finals, CBS completely revamped the opening montage. The computer-generated imagery (once again set in and around a virtual arena) was made to look more realistic (live-action footage was incorporated in the backdrops). Also, the familiar theme music was rearranged to sound more intricate and to have a more emotional impact, along the lines of the network's later World Series coverage. Between the 1989 NBA Finals and the 1990 NBA Finals' intros, there is a slight theme tune revision. The 1989 Finals intro had a lot more of a guitar riff to it. Meanwhile, the 1990 Finals intro carried a little more usage of a trumpet sound.

CBS would also create special intros during the NBA Finals composed of music from either Terms of Endearment or St. Elmo's Fire playing in the background.

On June 14, 1990, CBS televised its final NBA broadcast to date. It was Game 5 of the NBA Finals between the Detroit Pistons and Portland Trail Blazers. As a way of saying farewell and thank you to the viewers after 17 years, CBS used Marvin Gaye's rendition of "The Star-Spangled Banner" from the 1983 NBA All-Star Game as the soundtrack for their closing montage (featuring the greatest moments in the history of The NBA on CBS).

NBC

"Roundball Rock" was the theme music NBC used for its game telecasts from 1990 to 2002. The theme became synonymous with NBA basketball, primarily because it was used at the height of the Michael Jordan era (and the height of the NBA's popularity). Written by John Tesh, "Roundball Rock" went through several slight variations (including two different versions used in 2001 for going into commercial breaks, and a separate rendition for NBC's WNBA telecasts) but remained virtually the same for all twelve years of its existence.

The theme was sampled by Nelly in his song "Heart of a Champion" and was used in both an NBA on NBC video game and the movie Like Mike. Both Conan O'Brien and Craig Kilborn paid comedic tributes to the theme when the NBA on NBC ended, and Tesh was asked about the theme by O'Brien when he appeared on his show in late 2004. During that same episode of Late Night with Conan O'Brien, the theme was played over footage of the recent Pacers–Pistons brawl.

NBC recently brought back the theme for its coverage of basketball during the 2008 Summer Olympics and again for the 2016 Summer Olympics. In December 2018, Fox Sports acquired the rights to the theme for use during college basketball telecasts on Fox and its sister networks.

ABC

Until the Pacers–Pistons brawl, ABC and ESPN used a heavy amount of hip hop and heavy metal music during pregame montages. On the January 4, 2003 telecast of a Dallas Mavericks/Philadelphia 76ers game, ABC played the Ludacris song "Move Bitch" and censored expletives by using the sound of dogs barking (although in the edited version, most expletives, especially those in the chorus, are replaced with sounds of women screaming). In the wake of the NBA taking steps to fix negative perceptions of its players, little to no rap music is played prior to games on either network.

ABC's current NBA game theme is called "Fast Break", by Non-Stop Music. It is the third game theme the network has had, dating back to 2002–03. The theme is now also used on ESPN NBA coverage.

ABC's earlier coverage of NBA basketball, ending with the 1972–1973 season, included a theme song with lyrics. Including also with the 2012 playoffs with intro music .Among the lyrics were the lines,

List of music and performers used
Robert Randolph and the Family Band: Hired to write ABC's theme song for the 2002–03 NBA season. ABC built its slogan around the song "We Got Hoops" and used it as game music for the Christmas Day 2002 and January 4, 2003 telecasts. Beginning with a February 16, 2003 doubleheader, ABC dropped the theme (with the exception of marketing and commercials).
LL Cool J: Performed a rap song about the San Antonio Spurs and New Jersey Nets that was played prior to each edition of NBA Shootaround during the 2003 NBA Finals. The song, which had the refrain of "Spurs–Nets goin' to war", aired before each of the six pregame shows.
Justin Timberlake: Wrote a song specifically for the NBA; "Can't Get Enough" premiered as the NBA on ABC theme song on Christmas Day 2003, with several commercials in the weeks leading up to the game featuring Timberlake himself. On the Christmas Day telecast, Timberlake was featured in the opening montage. Footage of him was removed from the introduction for all subsequent telecasts. ABC used the instrumental from "Can't Get Enough" as its theme for most of the season. As the season went on, "Can't Get Enough" was gradually phased out.
The Black Eyed Peas: ABC and ESPN both used the Black Eyed Peas song "Let's Get It Started" prominently in television commercials for the 2004 NBA playoffs. Members of the Black Eyed Peas, as well as NBA legends (including Bill Russell and Kareem Abdul-Jabbar) and ABC broadcaster Al Michaels were featured in the advertisements. During the 2004 NBA Finals, "Let's Get It Started" was used in ABC's opening montage and as the theme music.
The Jackson 5: In the lead-up to the Los Angeles Lakers–Miami Heat game on Christmas Day 2004, ABC used a modified version of the Jackson 5's "ABC" in advertisements.

Destiny's Child: Starting with the Christmas Day 2004 Heat–Lakers telecast, ABC used the Destiny's Child song "Lose My Breath" as the music for their introductory montage. The song was used through the rest of the regular season, and through the first few weeks of the 2005 NBA playoffs.
Rob Thomas: Starting on May 14, 2005, prior to a Saturday night playoff telecast between the Washington Wizards and Miami Heat, ABC began using Rob Thomas's song "This Is How a Heart Breaks" as the music for the opening montage. The song was aired prior to every telecast the season, including Game 7 of the 2005 NBA Finals. ABC used a multitude of popular music prior to the start of the second half of games, in the McDonald's Halftime Highlights segment.
Tom Petty: For the 2006 NBA playoffs and Finals, ABC used music from Tom Petty and the Heartbreakers for its pregame montages. Though "Runnin' Down a Dream" was the main song used, ABC also played "Makin' Some Noise", "I Won't Back Down" and "You Wreck Me", among others. By contrast to 2005, Petty's theme was not played during the introductions for the NBA Finals. Instead, ABC opted to air a montage of historical NBA Finals moments.
The Pussycat Dolls: For the 2006-07 NBA season, ABC selected The Pussycat Dolls to perform "Right Now" as the open for NBA games.
Def Leppard and Tim McGraw: The song "Nine Lives" was selected for the 2007–08 NBA season as its opening.
U2: The song "Get On Your Boots" has been used for the 2009 NBA playoffs as its opening.
Rolling Stones: The song "Rip This Joint" is used as the opener for ABC/ESPN's 2010 NBA playoffs coverage.
Mariah Carey: The song "All I Want for Christmas Is You" is used in a music video she created in 2009 promoting ABC/ESPN's coverage of the games played on Christmas Day. In 2010, "Oh Santa!" was also used for ABC/ESPN's Christmas Day coverage.
Nicole Scherzinger and Jason Bonham: The remake of Led Zeppelin's "Black Dog" was used to open the 2011 NBA playoffs coverage and ABC's coverage of Lakers–Celtics during the 2012 regular season on March 11, 2012.
Cee-Lo Green: The song "Fight to Win" is used to open the 2012 NBA playoffs coverage.
will.i.am: The song "#thatPOWER" was used to open the coverage for the 2013 NBA playoffs.
Pitbull: The song "Timber" was used to open the coverage for the 2014 NBA playoffs.
The Black Eyed Peas: A song named "Awesome" was used to open the coverage for the 2015 NBA playoffs. The advertisements featured The Black Eyed Peas, James Harden and the cast of Pitch Perfect 2.
Kendrick Lamar: An edited version of the song "Humble" was used to over the coverage for the 2017 NBA playoffs, with an edited version of "DNA" being used during the 2017 NBA Finals.
J. Cole: When the album KOD was released on April 20, 2018, his song "ATM" was used under certain coverage for the 2018 NBA playoffs. Later, songs such as "KOD" and "Motiv8" would be heard for promotion also.

TNT/TBS

TNT's NBA theme music, composed by Trevor Rabin, has been used since the 2002–03 NBA season, the longest of the league's three broadcast partners. The theme music was slightly modified for the 2010–11 NBA season, but still retained the familiar theme music with additional compositions. In 2006, TNT used the Fort Minor Remember the Name as secondary music for its playoff coverage and continues to do so in certain segments of their 2007 NBA playoffs coverage. In the late 1990s, TNT used a swing band to sing its theme (with the refrain of "It's the NBA on TNT tonight...") for promotional advertisements. Sister station TBS used Run-DMC to sing and create its theme during the early part of the 2000s.

During the 2008 NBA Playoffs, TNT used Busta Rhymes and Linkin Park's collaboration "We Made It" as promotion for the Western Conference.

The song "Champion" by Flipsyde was used to promote the 2009 NBA playoffs on TNT.

The song "More" by Usher was used to promote the 2010 NBA All-Star Game on TNT.

The song "Winner" by Jamie Foxx was used to promote the 2010 NBA playoffs on TNT.

The 2011 NBA on TNT – NBA Forever commercial included the song "Live Forever" by Drew Holcomb.

"Burn It Down" by Linkin Park was used in the teaser of the 2012 NBA playoffs on TNT.

The song "Come Get It Bae" by Pharrell Williams was used to promote the 2014 NBA playoffs on TNT.

The song "Take Me Higher (ft. Ashley DuBoSe)" by Mike Dreams featuring Ashley DuBose produced by Cody Daze was used after Warriors / Celtics game on November 16 on TNT.

League promotions
The NBA has used several artists in league produced promotions. During the 2000s, the league has used Pink's song "Get the Party Started", Christina Aguilera's song "Fighter", the Baha Men's song "Move It Like This" and Paul Simon's song "Father and Daughter" among others.

Where Amazing Happens
During the 2007–2008 season, the NBA ran a series of advertisements featuring still images set to the tune of Carly Comando's song "Everyday" with the promotional phrase Where Amazing Happens. Following the popularity of the original 30 second commercial, several others featuring Dirk Nowitzki, Chris Paul, and NBA Cares were produced. They have retained the Where Amazing Happens ads (along with Everyday) for the 2008–2009 season. The NBA Playoffs tagline, beginning in 2009, was Where Will Amazing Happen This Year?, usually accompanied with either Ludovico Einaudi's song Fly or Kanye West's song Amazing.

In the 2009–10 NBA season, new advertisements were aired, using Auto-tune to feature players and coaches "rapping" to a supplied hip-hop piece. Also during the season, several advertisements aiming towards Hispanic audiences were also produced, promoting its Spanish language website NBA.com/enebea

For the 2010–11 NBA season, the theme was Last Season was Last Season, featuring players looking to move forward from last year's disappointment in a renewed drive towards the NBA championship. In one of the newest commercials, gigantic Adobe Photoshop cutouts of the player's faces were used in substitute to their normal sized faces to provide a bobblehead effect. The bobblehead commercials has achieved popularity and the NBA plans to use another version in the future.

During the 2011 NBA playoffs, commercials featuring the animated talking official NBA ball were aired.

References

External links
NBA's Hip-Hop Identity Crisis: Too Ghetto?
More on the NBA hip-hop ban
Nowitzki's secret? Singing Hasselhoff
What is that Theme? Einaudi and NBA ads

Music
American hip hop
National Basketball Association controversies